is a 1972 Japanese drama and anti-war film written by John Nathan and directed by Hiroshi Teshigahara. It follows U.S. army deserter Jim who tries to seek refuge in Japan during the Vietnam War.

Plot
G.I. Jim has deserted from the U.S. Army and is seeking refuge in Japan. While he constantly changes his hide-outs, Jim, who does not speak the language, is confronted with cultural differences, meeting average Japanese people, political radicals who want to use him for their purposes, and other deserters.

Cast
 Keith Sykes as Jim
 Reisen Ri as Reiko
 Kazuo Kitamura as Tachikawa
 Toshiko Kobayashi as Mrs. Tachikawa
 Shōichi Ozawa as Tanikawa
 Tetsuko Kuroyanagi as Mrs. Tanikawa
 Teruko Kishi as Mother
 Hideo Kanze as Shimezu
 Hisashi Igawa as Ota
 Kunie Tanaka as Fujimura
 Takeshi Katō as Driver
 Greg Antonacci as Miguel
 Barry Cotton as Daryl
 John Nathan as Pete

Production and release
Summer Soldiers was Teshigahara's first feature film in four years, producing a script by American writer and translator John Nathan. It was the first time that director Teshigahara photographed one of his films himself. Summer Soldiers also marks the only time that Teshigahara's wife, actress Toshiko Kobayashi, starred in one of his films. Nathan later claimed that he directed the English-language scenes himself.

The film premiered in Japan in March 1972 and was shown at the Cannes Film Festival in May and the New York Film Festival in October that year.

In 2002, Summer Soldiers was included in the DVD collection Teshigahara Hiroshi no sekai ("The world of Hiroshi Teshigahara").

Reception
After its New York Film Festival screening, Vincent Canby of The New York Times described Summer Soldiers as "an intelligent, level-headed movie that refuses—bravely, I think—to deal in the sort of hysteria that denies the intention of other antiwar films". Tony Rayns, writing for Time Out magazine, was critical of the script's "over-schematisation", but pointed out the film's strengths which he found in "a rigorous honesty about the psychology of desertion, a complete absence of sentimentality, and a meticulous naturalism in the settings and incidental details".

In his compendium on Japanese film directors, film scholar Alexander Jacoby argued that Summer Soldiers "replaced the stylistic flamboyance of Teshigahara's sixties films with an informal, improvisational approach influenced by such independent filmmakers as John Cassavetes and Bob Rafelson".

Notes

References

External links
 

1972 films
Japanese war drama films
Anti-war films about the Vietnam War
Films directed by Hiroshi Teshigahara
Films scored by Toru Takemitsu
1970s Japanese films